The 1992 Monte Carlo Open was a men's tennis tournament played on outdoor clay courts. It was the 86th edition of the Monte Carlo Open, and was part of the ATP Championship Series, Single-Week of the 1992 ATP Tour. It took place at the Monte Carlo Country Club in Roquebrune-Cap-Martin, France, near Monte Carlo, Monaco, from 20 April through 26 April 1992. Unseeded Thomas Muster won the singles title.

Finals

Singles

 Thomas Muster defeated  Aaron Krickstein, 6–3, 6–1, 6–3
 It was Muster's 1st singles title of the year, and his 11th overall. It was his 1st Masters title of the year, and his 2nd overall.

Doubles

 'Boris Becker /  Michael Stich defeated  Petr Korda /  Karel Nováček, 6–4, 6–4

References

External links
 
 Association of Tennis Professionals (ATP) tournament profile
 ITF tournament edition details

 
Monte Carlo Open
Monte-Carlo Masters
1992 in Monégasque sport
Monte Carlo
Monte